The 1910 TCU Horned Frogs football team represented Texas Christian University (TCU) as a member of the Texas Intercollegiate Athletic Association (TIAA) during the 1910 college football season. Led by Kemp Lewis in his first and only year as head coach, TCU compiled an overall record of 2–6–1. TCU returned in 1910 to Fort Worth, Texas, where the university had been founded, after operating the previous 15 years in Waco, Texas. The 1910 football team played their home games at Haines Park and Butz Park in Fort Worth. The team's captain was William Massie, who played center.

Schedule

References

TCU
TCU Horned Frogs football seasons
TCU football